Million Dollar Cold Case is an Australian true crime and documentary television show that first screened on the Seven Network on 15 March 2017. The series presents cold cases and appeals to viewers to help provide any leads or clues that could help solve a past crime, with a 1 million reward on offer. Details about the victim, the original investigation and interviews with witnesses and relatives of the victims are featured, as well as information about potential suspects.

The program was first announced at Seven's upfronts in 2016 and has cooperation with the Homicide Squad Cold Case Team.

Broadcast
The series debuted in Australia on the Seven Network on 15 March 2017.

Episodes

References

2017 Australian television series debuts
2017 Australian television series endings
2010s Australian crime television series
Australian non-fiction television series
Seven Network original programming
English-language television shows